Eduard Prandstetter (born 15 December 1948), is a Czech chess International Master (IM) (1979), two times Czechoslovak Chess Championship winner (1976, 1978).

Biography
Eduard Prandstetter achieved the greatest success in his chess career in 1976 and in 1978 when he twice won the Czechoslovak Chess Championship. In 1985 in Taxco he participated in the World Chess Championship Interzonal Tournament where ranked in 14th place.

His other successes in international chess tournaments included, among others shared 1st place in Prague (1981, tournament Bohemians, together with Jan Ambrož), 2nd place in Cienfuegos (1983, Capablanca Memorial, after Lev Psakhis), 3rd place in Dortmund (1987, tournament B) and 3rd place in Dortmund (1988).

Eduard Prandstetter played for Czechoslovakia in the European Team Chess Championships:
 In 1977, at seventh board in the 6th European Team Chess Championship in Moscow (+0, =1, -2),
 In 1980, at fifth board in the 7th European Team Chess Championship in Skara (+0, =2, -3).

In 1979, he was awarded the FIDE International Master (IM) title.

References

External links

Eduard Prandstetter chess games at 365chess.com

1948 births
Living people
Sportspeople from Prague
Czechoslovak chess players
Czech chess players
Chess International Masters